Jack William Pithey  (30 December 1903 – 20 November 1984) was a Rhodesian politician who served as the unrecognised state's Acting President between 1 November 1978 and 5 March 1979. He was also the President of the Senate of Rhodesia from 1970 to 1978 having previously been Member of Parliament for the Avondale constituency in north-west Salisbury (now Harare) between 1964 and 1970.

Biography

Jack Pithey was born in Potchefstroom in the Transvaal on 30 December 1903; he moved to Rhodesia on 5 September 1923. He was Secretary for Justice and Internal Affairs between 1958 and 1961 during the Federation of Rhodesia and Nyasaland, and later the Secretary for Justice in Rhodesia between 1962 and 1963. He was appointed Commander of the Order of the British Empire in the 1963 New Year Honours.

Family

He married Mary Wood on 1 September 1931; they had two sons and a daughter. Both his sons, Tony and David Pithey, represented Rhodesia in cricket and played Test cricket for South Africa. He died on 20 November 1984, and his Rhodesian estate was subsequently liquidated.

References

Newitt, Louise (ed). Prominent Rhodesian Personalities (Cover Publicity Services, Salisbury, 1977).

1903 births
1984 deaths
People from Potchefstroom
White South African people
South African people of British descent
Presidents of Rhodesia
Rhodesian politicians
Rhodesian Front politicians
Members of the Parliament of Rhodesia
South African emigrants to Rhodesia
Date of death missing
Commanders of the Order of the British Empire